William Monson may refer to:

 William L. Monson, American cable television businessman
 William Monson (Royal Navy officer) (1569–1643), English admiral
 William Monson, 1st Viscount Monson (died c. 1673), one of the Regicides of King Charles I of England
 William Monson, 1st Viscount Oxenbridge (1829–1898), Baron in the Peerage of Great Britain
 William Monson (1760–1807), Member of Parliament for Lincoln, 1806–1807
 Sir William Monson, 4th Baronet (1653–1727), English politician